Upper Swan is a suburb of Perth, Western Australia, located in the City of Swan local government area.

It contains Upper Swan Primary School.

References

Suburbs of Perth, Western Australia
Suburbs and localities in the City of Swan